Besnaya - Bseineh  is a Syrian village located in Harem Nahiyah in Harem District, Idlib.  According to the Syria Central Bureau of Statistics (CBS), Besnaya - Bseineh had a population of 1034 in the 2004 census.

History 
On 6 February 2023, a large block of residential and commercial buildings collapsed in the Turkey–Syria earthquake.

References 

Populated places in Harem District